Thomas Martin Meehan (11 March 1909 – 24 April 1957) was an Australian rules footballer who played with Fitzroy in the Victorian Football League (VFL).

Family
The son of Thomas Michael Meehan (1884-1960), and Ellen Mary Meehan (1887-194), née O'Callaghan, Thomas Martin Meehan was born at Beaufort, Victoria on 11 March 1909.

He married Julia Irene Punch (1909-1977) on 1 March 1930.

Football

Williamstown (VFA)
He played his first game for the Williamstown First XVIII, at the age of 17, on 12 June 1926.

Fitzroy (VFL)
He was eventually cleared from Williamstown to Fitzroy in June 1928.

Williamstown (VFA)
He was cleared from Fitzroy to Williamstown in April 1929.

Death
He died at Parkville, Victoria on 24 April 1957.

Notes

References
 
 Victorian League Football 1928 — Fitzroy Team, The Weekly Times, (Saturday, 7 July 1928), p.45.
 Williamstown Invades Northcote's Territory, The Age, (Monday, 17 June 1929), p.6.
 World War Two Nominal Roll: Flight Sergeant Thomas Martin Meehan (53779), Department of Veterans' Affairs.
 World War Two Service Record: Flight Sergeant Thomas Martin Meehan (53779), National Archives of Australia.

External links 
 
 
 Tom Meehan's playing statistics from The VFA Project.
 Tom Meehan at Boyles Football Photos.

1909 births
1957 deaths
Australian rules footballers from Victoria (Australia)
Fitzroy Football Club players
Williamstown Football Club players